Women's Refuge  is a 1946  Argentine film directed and written by Arturo S. Mom with the script written by Emilio Villalba Welsh. The film starred Aída Alberti and Orestes Caviglia, and Bertha Moss. The film is centred on women with feminist themes.

Cast
In alphabetical order: 
 Aída Alberti
 Orestes Caviglia
 Milagros de la Vega
 Golde Flami
 María Rosa Gallo
 Bertha Moss
 Horacio Priani
 Lydia Quintana
 José Ruzzo
 Leticia Scury
 Marino Seré

Release
The film premiered on 16 August 1946.

References

External links
 
 Photographs

1946 films
1940s Spanish-language films
Argentine black-and-white films
Films directed by Arturo S. Mom
1946 drama films
Argentine drama films
1940s Argentine films